Tartu SK 10 was an Estonian football club, playing in the town of Tartu.

History
After winning II Liiga Southern/Western zone in 2011, HaServ was promoted to Esiliiga for the next season. It then merged with SK 10 Premium Tartu and will played under the name SK 10 Tartu.

References

1995 establishments in Estonia
Defunct football clubs in Estonia
2013 disestablishments in Estonia